Lathrop High School, located in Lathrop, California, is a secondary school in the Manteca Unified School District. Its doors opened on August 11, 2008. LHS is known as the "Home of the Spartans".

History
Lathrop High became the first secondary school in the city of Lathrop. With no high school in the city, students within Lathrop city limits fed into the surrounding high schools in the district, with Sierra High School being the primary recipient of Lathrop students. With the growing population in the central valley, the Manteca Unified School District made the decision to create a new high school in the growing city of Lathrop. Lathrop High School opened in fall 2008, with David Chamberlain as the principal.  The student population started with roughly 500 students, consisting only of freshmen and sophomores.

Lathrop High School now has a student population over 1,200.

Demographics
As of 2012–2018:
Hispanic/Latino 60%
Filipino 20%
White 10%
African American 5%
Asian 4%
Pacific Islander 1%
American Indians 1%
Mixed race 0%

Athletics
Lathrop High School has 11 different sports teams and participate in the Western Athletic Conference.

The teams are as follows:

Football
Basketball (Girls and Boys)
Baseball 
Softball
Soccer (Girls and Boys)
Wrestling
Volleyball (Girls and Boys)
Tennis (Girls and Boys)
Track and Field
Golf (Girls and Boys)
Cross Country 
Swim (Girls and Boys)

Performing arts
Performing arts for Lathrop High School has three different sections to it. Drama taught by Mrs. Pangburn, Band taught by Ms. Bugarin and choir taught by Ms. Vaneerde. The drama program puts on at least three plays every year and it has recently put on a haunted house called "Casa De Los Muertos" aka. House of the Dead. It had scenes from Little Red riding hood to the Maddest Hatter.

References

 http://school-ratings.com/school_details/39685930116376.html

External links
 Official website
Public high schools in California
High schools in San Joaquin County, California
Lathrop, California
2008 establishments in California
Educational institutions established in 2008